Wushi Zhongkuilu is a late-13th-century Medieval Chinese culinary work on household cookery written by an anonymous author from the Pujiang region known only as "Madame Wu". It is the earliest known culinary work written by or attributed to a Chinese woman and is believed to have been published in during late Song Dynasty or early Yuan dynasty.

Content 
The full title of the work is "Song Dynasty Pujiang Woman of the Wu Surname Records on Household Essentials", which echo's the contents of the book as a detailed guide for preparing essential household dietary ingredients and dishes of the period. This includes cooked items as well as various pickled and preserved foods that can be eaten straight or used as ingredients.

Wu's work consists of three chapters grouped according to the types of recipes and originating ingredients:

 "Preserved Meats and Pickled Fish": 20 sections
 "Vegetable preparations": 38 sections
 "Sweet foods": 15 sections

It is also the first published work that described the use of soy sauce seasoning in dishes (referred to as "醤油") along with the more typical soy, fish, and meat based seasoning pastes common during Medieval China.

See also 
 Shilin Guangji, another book on cooking written during the Yuan dynasty

References

External links

 Text at Chinese Text Project

Chinese cuisine
Chinese cookbooks
13th-century books

Yuan dynasty literature
Song dynasty literature